The Islamic Republic News Agency (Xabargozâri-ye Jomhuri-ye Eslâmi), or IRNA, is the official news agency of the Islamic Republic of Iran. Founded on 13 November 1934 as Pars News Agency during the time of the Shah, it is government-funded and controlled under the Iranian Ministry of Culture and Islamic Guidance. The agency also publishes the newspaper Iran. , the Managing Director of IRNA is Ali Naderi. IRNA has 60 offices in Iran and 30 more in various countries around the world.

History

In 1934, Pars Agency was established by the Foreign Ministry of Iran (Persia) as the country's official national news outlet. For the next six years it operated under the Iranian Foreign Ministry working to disseminate national and international news. Pars Agency published a bulletin twice daily in French and Persian, which it circulated among government officials, international news agencies in Tehran and the local press. In May 1940, the General Tablighat Department was founded and the agency then became an affiliate of the department. Agence France Press (AFP) was the first international news agency whose reports Pars Agency used. Gradually, the Iranian news agency expanded its sources of news stories to include those of Reuters, the Associated Press (AP) and the United Press International (UPI). An agreement with the Anatolia News Agency of Turkey further expanded the agency's news outlets to countries worldwide. The link-up also enabled it to provide classified bulletins to a limited number of high-ranking public officials.

In 1954, following a coup the reforms of the White Revolution helped to modernize the Pars Agency, leading to expanded news coverage, improved professional services and a better-educated staff. It went on air with radio broadcasts of international news translated into Persian, which it offered to local subscribers. Under the new regime, it operated under the supervision of various state offices and ministries such as the Ministry of Culture, Ministry of Post, Telegraph and Telephones, Office of the Prime Minister and the Labor Ministry until 1947. In 1957, the General Department of Tablighat fell under the supervision of the Publications Department of Tehran Radio as an independent department. In 1963 the activities of Pars Agency were brought under the newly created Information Ministry. Its name was changed to Pars News Agency, or PANA, and it began operating around the clock. In July 1975 the Iranian legislature passed a bill establishing the Ministry of Information and Tourism and changing the status of Pars News Agency to a joint public stock with capital assets of about 300 million rials. It then became an affiliate of the new ministry. Its Articles of Association in 23 paragraphs and notes were adopted by the then National Consultative Assembly of Iran.

After the Iranian Revolution in February 1979, the Revolutionary Council (Shawra-ye-Enqelab), in June 1979, renamed the Ministry of Information and Tourism to the National Guidance Ministry (or Ministry of National Guidance). The same year Pars News Agency was renamed as the Islamic Republic News Agency.

Controversies 
IRNA has been place under scrutiny in the past for spreading misinformation about various different events, including COVID-19, Israel, and the attempted assassination of Iraqi PM Mustafa al-Kadhimi. The organization's accuracy has been additionally questioned for citing The Onion, a satirical news website. 

The following list documents different controversies or false claims:

 The November 7 2021 drone strike on Iraqi Prime Minister Mustafa al-Kadhimi was a "false flag" attack by the United States.
 "Extreme Zionists" and the Free Syrian Army do not believe in the threat of Covid-19.
 Featuring an image of burning planes during the 2019 Gaza War, describing it as the aftermath of an Iranian airstrike on U.S. forces in Iraq.
 An attack on protesters during the 2021 Sistan and Baluchistan protests was the product of foreign "involvement in inserting insurgency and unrest into Iran".
 Edward Snowden released files alleging that Daesh was created by the United States, United Kingdom, and Israel.

References

External links
Official website

1934 establishments in Iran
Government agencies established in 1934
Government of the Islamic Republic of Iran
Iranian propaganda organisations
News agencies based in Iran
Mass media companies established in 1934
Mass media in Tehran
State media